Michel Ory (born 18 April 1966) is a Swiss amateur astronomer and a prolific discoverer of minor planets and comets.

Biography 
Ory was born in Develier, in the district of Delémont in the canton of Jura in Switzerland. He attended school in Delémont, and at the cantonal school in Porrentruy, then studied at the University of Geneva, graduating in physics in 1990. He trained as a scientific journalist at Cedos SA in Carouge, qualifying in 1992, then undertook teacher training at the Institut pédagogique in Porrentruy, qualifying as a secondary school teacher in 1994, then becoming a physics teacher at the cantonal school in Porrentruy, a position which he continues to hold in 2012. Ory is married and has two children.

A keen amateur astronomer, he joined the Jura Astronomical Society in 1990 and between 1993 and 1998 he was one of the seven member-builders of the Jura Astronomical Observatory.

Awards
He was one of five winners of the 2009 Edgar Wilson Award for his discovery on 27 August 2008 of 304P/Ory (P/2008 Q2 Ory), a periodic comet of the Jupiter family, using a 24-inch f/3.9 reflector at the Jura Observatory in Switzerland. 

In 2018, he was awarded a Gene Shoemaker NEO Grant which will improve the robotic survey he conducts in collaboration with Claudine Rinner at the Oukaïmeden Observatory  in Morocco. He is a teacher of physics at the cantonal school in Porrentruy, Switzerland. The main-belt asteroid 67979 Michelory was named in his honor.

In 2020, he and Claudine Rinner jointly received the Dorothea Klumpke - Isaac Roberts prize from the Société astronomique de France.

Discoveries 

During 2000–2010, Michel Ory has made a large number of discoveries of different astronomical objects at several observatory sites. As per 2016, he is credited by the Minor Planet Center with the discovery of 199 numbered minor planets he made during 2001–2010.

At the Jura Observatory, located in Vicques, Switzerland, he made his most famous discovery, 304P/Ory, a periodic comet of the Jupiter family, and also discovered over 234 asteroids (including unnumbered bodies) and two supernovae. Ory also made discoveries at two other observatory sites in the U.S., namely at Tenagra II Observatory (926), Arizona, and at Sierra Stars Observatory (G68), California, from where he discovered another 11 and 2 asteroids, respectively.

Comet 304P/Ory 

It was on the nights of 26–27 and 27–28 August 2008 that Ory discovered what he thought was a near-Earth asteroid, which he reported to the Minor Planet Center, Harvard. At around 8:08 p.m. on August 28 he received notification from the Central Bureau for Astronomical Telegrams (CBAT) that the object was in fact a periodic comet: the announcement ran, "An apparently asteroidal object discovered by Michel Ory (Delemont, Switzerland, on CCD images obtained with a 0.61-m f/3.9 reflector at Vicques; discovery observation tabulated below), which was posted on the Minor Planet Center's 'NEOCP' webpage, has been found by other CCD observers to be cometary."

The comet was named 304P/Ory (P/2008 Q2 Ory) after him, and the CBAT announcement brought congratulations from around the world. The comet orbits the sun in an elliptical orbit with a period of 5.96 years.

Ory received the Edgar Wilson Award from the Smithsonian Astrophysical Observatory at Harvard University, and later in 2008 a square in Viques was named Place de la Comète P/2008 Q2 Ory in honour of his discovery.

List of discovered minor planets

References

External links 
 Amateur stargazer Michel Ory spots comet, Herald Sun, 2008
 Un Jurassien rejoint le panthéon des découvreurs de comètes, Le Quotidien Jurassien, 1 September 2008 
 J'ai passé plus de 550 nuits à l'observatoire, 20minutes, 1 September 2008 
 Ory est de la taille de la Terre, Le Matin, 6 September 2008
 Accoucheur du ciel, Le Temps, 6 September 2008 
 L'invité de la rédaction: Michel Ory, Le Quotidien Jurassien, 11 October 2008 
 Portrait: Michel Ory, une comète comme un pro!, Ciel et espace de novembre 2008 (no. 426)

1966 births
Discoverers of comets
Discoverers of minor planets
Discoverers of supernovae

Living people
People from Delémont
20th-century Swiss astronomers
University of Geneva alumni
21st-century Swiss astronomers